Thurstonland is a rural village in the civil parish of Kirkburton in Kirklees, West Yorkshire, England. It has a population of almost 400.

Thurstonland Urban District was created in 1894 and merged with Farnley Tyas urban district in 1925 to form Thurstonland and Farnley Tyas Urban District. Both were abolished in 1938 under a County Review Order, and most of the district was merged into Kirkburton Urban District and the remainder into the Holmfirth Urban District. It is a few miles outside the borders of the Peak District National Park.

The village is on a hilltop above Brockholes, south-east of Farnley Tyas and north of Shepley in the Huddersfield (HD4) postal district.

The village has a public house, first school (Thurstonland Endowed First School), church, children's recreational area and cricket club.  Apart from the pub on the southern edge of the village the other facilities are all located next to each other, at the northern edge. Through the hill is the Thurstonland Tunnel on the Penistone railway line, between Brockholes railway station and Stocksmoor railway station.

Within and around the village are a number of small dairy farms that supply the surrounding area.

History
The village was first mentioned as Tostenland in the Domesday Book of 1086.
The Wakefield court rolls indicate the village was a township in 1275, when 'Storthes in Thurstonland' is mentioned and 'Matthew de Storthes', in the reign of Henry III (1216 to 1272) lived in the area.  In 1541 Henry VIII granted "to John Storthes of Shitlington, but likewise of Storthes Hall, gentleman" the manor of Thurstonland and other lands that had been the property of Roche Abbey.

Storthes Hall, on the northern boundary of the township, was the location of a family mansion. It is now the site of a residential campus for the University of Huddersfield.

Sport
The cricket club was founded in 1874 by a group of local enthusiasts. The club acquired a site in 1901, which was their third home. The club's Edwardian-style wooden pavilion was built in 1910. The club play in the Huddersfield Cricket League and run teams for seniors and juniors.

See also
Listed buildings in Kirkburton

References

External links

Vision of Britain - Thurstonland & Farnley Tyas
Thurstonland Village Association
History of Britain

Villages in West Yorkshire
Peak District
Holme Valley
Towns and villages of the Peak District
Kirkburton